Iqbal College, is an undergraduate and postgraduate, co-educational minority college located in Peringammala near Palode, Thiruvananthapuram, Kerala. It was established in the year 1964. The college is affiliated with Kerala University. This college offers different courses in arts, science and commerce.

History 
Iqbal College is founded in 1964, as a junior college with the affiliation of the University of Kerala. It won acclaim as the first college owned by the Muslim community in Thiruvananthapuram district and the pioneer in Nedumangadu Taluk. It was elevated to a first grade college in 1995. The University Grants Commission, New Delhi included the college in the 2(f) and 12(B) list in 1987. The college started its first PG course in 1995. In 2010, the Kerala University approved the college as a Research center in the field of Commerce. Admission is open to all candidates without caste and creed discriminations. The college benefits the society at large, especially SC, ST, OBC and other marginalized communities.

The campus spreads on a  hillock, on a lovely and picturesque greenbelt, on the slopes of the Western Ghats, at the backdrop of the Ponmudi hills, which provides a serene and tranquil atmosphere for teaching and learning. The college stands for academic excellence in every aspect. The curricular and co curricular activities implemented could identify the hidden talents of the students and nurture them to genius. The college has a god alumni record who have proved their capabilities in various walks of life.

The source and strengths behind the institution is a team of personalities who are committed, highly qualified, professionally competent, morally upright and just. The management would like this institution to be a centre of excellence at all times. The Management and Faculty – the flesh and blood of the institution – have always upheld the slogan “Mission serve humanity and clear visions rule the missions”. The institution works to develop the innate abilities of students and become the leaders of tomorrow.

Departments

Science
Physics
Chemistry
Mathematics
Botany
Zoology

Arts and Commerce
Malayalam
English
Arabic
Hindi
History
Politics
Economics
Physical Education
Commerce

Accreditation
The college is  recognised by the University Grants Commission (UGC).

References

External links
https://www.iqbalcollege.edu.in

Universities and colleges in Thiruvananthapuram district
Educational institutions established in 1964
1964 establishments in Kerala
Arts and Science colleges in Kerala
Colleges affiliated to the University of Kerala